Ricardo Wayne Gardner (born 25 September 1978), commonly known as Bibi, is a Jamaican former professional footballer. He works as assistant coach at Portmore United. A left winger, he could also play in the centre of midfield or at left wingback. He last played for Bolton Wanderers in May 2012, completing a 14-year spell at the club, of which 11 were spent in the Premier League. Gardner earned 111 caps for the Jamaica national football team, scoring 9 goals and playing at four CONCACAF Gold Cups and the 1998 FIFA World Cup.

Playing career

Club career

Early career
Born in Saint Andrew, Jamaica, Gardner began his professional career with Harbour View, where he debuted as a starter at the age of only 14 years. He also, representing Wolmer's Boys' High School, dominated the local high school football leagues and was considered outstanding. His performances for Jamaica during the 1998 World Cup attracted English First Division side Bolton Wanderers to offer Harbour View £1 million for his services.

Bolton Wanderers
Gardner immediately established himself a place in the first team for Bolton. He came on as a substitute to make his debut against Hartlepool in the League Cup on 25 August 1998, and made his league debut as a substitute again against West Bromwich Albion on 8 September 1998. In this game, Bolton were reduced to 10 men after the sending off of Guðni Bergsson shortly after Gardner came on, but he scored a late winner to give his team a memorable 3–2 victory over West Brom. He made 22 appearances, half of them starts, in his first year while scoring three goals. In his second season, 1999–2000, he established a place in the starting eleven, starting 23 of 26 games, that he has held on to since. Although Gardner suffered a cruciate ligament injury that took him out of action at the end of the season, he made a full recovery, and was able to return to the starting line-up in 2000–01 (scoring in the 2001 Division One Play off Final), playing with the promoted Bolton in the Premier League. He was voted Bolton Wanderers F.C. Player of the Year for the 2005–06 season by the club's fans. Due to a knee injury, Gardner did not make his first appearance in the 2006–07 season until December.

In November 2007, he scored his first goal at club level in nearly five years when he opened the scoring in Bolton's 2–2 draw against German giants Bayern Munich at the Allianz Arena in the UEFA Cup group stage. A year later after being moved from a wing-back role back into midfield he scored in the Wanderers 2–0 win over local rivals Manchester City.

Gardner made his 400th appearance for Bolton in a 3–0 defeat to Fulham on 27 April 2011. On 24 May 2011, he was in discussions to extend his Bolton contract into a fourteenth year. Gardner rejected a move to West Ham United favouring to sign a new one-year contract at Bolton, which he signed on 5 August. He made four league appearances at the beginning of the next season but was sent off for two bookable offences in Bolton's 3–1 defeat at Swansea City on 29 October  and then suffered an injury, making no further appearances that year.

At the close of the January 2012 transfer window, he wasn't named in Bolton's twenty five man Premier League squad for the second half of the season meaning he would play no further part in the league campaign. It was later revealed that he had been omitted due to having had an operation on his knee that the Bolton medical staff could not guarantee he would recover from in time to play again that season. It was announced on 18 May 2012 that Ricardo had left the club in line with the expiration of his contract. At the time, Gardner was the second longest serving foreign player in Premier League history after serving fourteen years at Bolton, only beaten by his former Bolton teammate Jussi Jääskeläinen.

Preston North End (loan)
On 8 March 2011, Gardner went to Preston North End on an emergency one-month loan as cover for Phil Brown's side. Bolton manager Owen Coyle said it was a great chance for Gardner to improve his match fitness after only just recovering from injury.

He made his debut the following day at the left-back position in the 2–1 loss to Leeds United and played three more games for the club.

Retirement
After the end of his contract with Bolton Wanderers, he spent a year training at his old club, West Ham United and Barnsley to keep up his fitness, and played in two reserve team matches for West Ham but decided to leave England to seek a move to the MLS. 
He went on an unsuccessful trial at Real Salt Lake where he played for the reserves in a 1–0 win against the Portland Timbers reserves and announced his official retirement in May 2014.

International career
Gardner rose to international prominence following the 1998 World Cup.
Gardner was an important player for the Jamaican national team and earned his place as the team's captain, captaining the team between 2005 and 2009. He also captained the team for one game in 2012 at the 2012 Caribbean Cup.

Coaching career
In December 2015, Gardner was appointed as coach of the Jamaica U-20 team. Gardner resigned as Harbour View FC Head coach in December 2018. In March 2019, Gardner joined the staff of Portmore United as assistant coach. In 2021, Gardner left his role as head of Portmore United to move back to England.

Personal life
Gardner is a rastafarian and sports dreadlocks. He is part owner, with Robert Scarlett and Ian Goodison, of a record label, Heart of Love Production, which promotes ragga and dancehall music.

Career statistics
Source:

Honours
 Caribbean Cup: 1998
 2001 Football League First Division Play-offs
 Bolton Wanderers F.C. Player of the Year: 2005–2006

See also 
List of men's footballers with 100 or more international caps

References

External links

1978 births
People from Saint Andrew Parish, Jamaica
Living people
Jamaican Rastafarians
Association football defenders
Jamaican footballers
Jamaica international footballers
Jamaican expatriate footballers
Expatriate footballers in England
Bolton Wanderers F.C. players
Preston North End F.C. players
Harbour View F.C. players
English Football League players
Premier League players
1998 CONCACAF Gold Cup players
1998 FIFA World Cup players
2000 CONCACAF Gold Cup players
2003 CONCACAF Gold Cup players
2009 CONCACAF Gold Cup players
FIFA Century Club